Haugsgjerd is a Norwegian surname. Notable people with the surname include:

Hilde Haugsgjerd (born 1952), Norwegian newspaper editor
Svein Haugsgjerd (born 1942), Norwegian psychiatrist and psychoanalyst

Norwegian-language surnames